William Russell (6 October 1777 – 21 November 1813) was an English organist and composer.

Life
He was the son of William Russell, an organ-builder, and was born in London on 6 October 1777. From age seven Russell was taught by the organists William Cope, William Shrubsole, and John Groombridge. Between 1789 and 1793 he was deputy to his father, who was organist to St. Mary's, Aldermanbury.

In 1793, Russell was appointed organist to the Great Queen Street chapel; cathedral services were performed there until 1798, when the chapel became a Wesleyan meeting-house. On 2 September 1798 he was elected organist at St. Anne's, Limehouse. In 1801 he was elected to a similar post at the Foundling Hospital. About the same time he resumed musical studies under Samuel Arnold.

In 1808, Russell graduated Mus. Bac. at Oxford. He died on 21 November 1813 at Cobham Row, Coldbath Fields, in Clerkenwell.

Works
Russell's organ voluntaries were in suite form. He published Twelve Voluntaries for the Organ or Pianoforte (1805), and a Second Book (1812). Job was an oratorio adaptation for organ or pianoforte, from Samuel Wesley, issued in 1826. He also composed music to Christopher Smart's Ode on St. Cecilia's Day (1800) and the Redemption of Israel, both of which were probably performed by the Cecilian Society, of which he was a member. A volume of psalms, hymns, and anthems was compiled by him for the Foundling Chapel in 1809.

Through Arnold's influence Russell obtained employment as composer and accompanist at theatres. Besides songs, he wrote overtures and incidental music. For Sadler's Wells he composed an overture to the Highland Camp (1800); music to Old Sadler's Ghost, to the Great Devil (with Broad), to Harlequin Greenlander, to St. George, to Zoa, and to Wizard's Wake in 1802. For Covent Garden Theatre he wrote a dance in Thomas Busby's Rugantino (1805), a new overture to Wild Islanders, and music for Adrian and Orilla (1806). For the Royal Circus he prepared music for the pieces Harlequin and Time and False Friend (1806).

Recordings 
 William Russell: Complete Organ Voluntaries, John Kitchen (organ), Delphian

Notes

Attribution

External links 
 Oxford Biography

1777 births
1813 deaths
English classical organists
English classical composers